The Michelangelo Towers is a hotel building in Sandton, South Africa. It is a prominent structure in the Sandton skyline and is one of South Africa's elite hotels, having accommodated guests such as former United States President Barack Obama, Oprah Winfrey, Angelina Jolie, Mariah Carey, Paris Hilton, Kanye West, Lady Gaga and Justin Bieber.

See also

 List of hotels in South Africa
 List of tallest buildings in South Africa

References

Hotels in South Africa
Skyscrapers in South Africa
Skyscraper hotels
Economy of Johannesburg
Johannesburg Region E
Hotel buildings completed in 2008
Hotels established in 2008
21st-century architecture in South Africa